David Sherry may refer to:

 David Sherry (philosopher), American philosopher
 David Sherry (artist) (born 1974), artist from Northern Ireland
 David Benjamin Sherry (born 1981), American photographer